Zvi Brenner (1915-1999) was a Jewish soldier in Palestine before and during World War II and the early days of the State of Israel. He trained under Orde Wingate and served alongside Moshe Dayan. He was one of the founders of the Israeli Defense Forces along with Dayan and Yigal Allon. After being wounded badly, he later served as the Secretary of the Kibbutzim Movement.  He was a leader of kibbutz Afikim until his death.

Early life 
Born in Poland in 1915, Zvi immigrated as a child to the United States with his mother and siblings, settling in Chicago. There he was one of the founders of the Hechalutz movement in the U.S. He was chosen in 1934 to join the new Kibbutz Afikim being established in Israel.

Palestine and the Special Night Squads 
Zvi joined the Hagana and participated in operations including a defense of Kibbutz Ramat HaKovesh and the establishment of Hanita in 1938.  It was in Hanita that Zvi was introduced to the British Captain Charles Orde Wingate.  Wingate established the Special Night Squads (SNS) which were units of Jews and British soldiers. Zvi was established as the commander of the SNS unit operating out of Afikim.

World War II 
When Palestinian Jews were allowed to join the British army to fight the Nazis, Zvi, newly married and a father, disobeyed Hagana orders and volunteered.  Eventually, the Jewish Brigade was formed in 1944.  In March, 1945, the Jewish Brigade fought the Germans on the front lines in northern Italy, where Zvi suffered a serious injury to his leg from a grenade.

References

Year of death missing
Israeli military personnel
1915 births
Israeli people of Polish-Jewish descent
Mandatory Palestine military personnel of World War II
Jewish Brigade personnel
Polish emigrants to the United States
American emigrants to Mandatory Palestine